Pravda is a rural locality (a settlement) in Volchikhinsky Selsoviet, Volchikhinsky District, Altai Krai, Russia. The population was 612 as of 2011. It was founded in 1921. There are 5 streets.

Geography 
Pravda is located 13 km northeast of Volchikha (the district's administrative centre) by road. Vostrovo is the nearest rural locality.

References 

Rural localities in Volchikhinsky District